Dragonology is a young adult book series about dragons, written in a non-fictional style. The series contains information on dragons, including information about how to befriend and protect them as well as an alphabet of the dragon language, ancient runes, and replica samples of Dragon Scales. The series later expanded to include figures and models, a strategic board game, card game, and a video game for the Nintendo DS. Books in the series are credited to fictional authors such as Dr Ernest Drake, a member of the Secret and Ancient Society of Dragonologists, and the author of the series' first book, Dragonology: The Complete Book of Dragons. 

The series first launched in 2003 the United States and Canada by Candlewick Press and in the United Kingdom by Templar Publishing. The publishers would eventually publish books with similar themes on the topics of wizardry, Egyptology, pirates, and monsters.

In 2012 Roberto Orci and Alex Kurtzman announced that they intended to produce a film adaptation of the books.

Products
The products are published in the United States and Canada by Candlewick Press and in the United Kingdom by Templar Publishing. The releases in the series include:

Books
 Dragonology: The Complete Book of Dragons (2003) by Dr. Ernest Drake, editor Dugald Steer, illustrators Helen Ward, Wayne Anderson, Nghiem Ta, Chris Forsey, A. J. Wood, and Douglas Carrel, 
 The Dragonology Handbook: A Practical Course in Dragons by Dr. Ernest Drake, editor Dugald Steer, 
 The Dragonology Chronicles: The Dragon's Eye by Dugald Steer, 
 Dragonology Pocket Adventures Collection:
 The Northern Frost Dragon
 The Dragon Dance
 The Winged Serpent
 Dragonology: Bringing Up Baby Dragons
 The Complete Works of Dragonology
 Dragonology: The Frost Dragon
 Dragonology: Field Guide to Dragons
 Drake's Comprehensive Compendium of Dragonology (2009) by Dr. Ernest Drake, editor Dugald Steer, illustrators Nghiem Ta, J.P. Lambert, A. J. Wood, Douglas Carrel, Tomislav Tomic, Nick Harris, Wayne Anderson, and Helen Ward
 The Field Guide to Dragonology

Book-sets
 Dragonology: Obscure Spells and Charms of Dragon Origin
 Dragonology: Tracking and Taming Dragons
 Dragonology: Field Guide to Dragons
 Dragonology: Code Writing Kit
 ''Dragonology: Drake's Comprehensive Compendium of Dragonology
Dragon pocket adventures

Sets, Games, and Toys
 Dragonology: The Game
 Dragonology: Hatch (cards)
 Series 1 Dragon Toys
 Series 2 Dragon Toys
 Miniature Dragon Toys
 Dragonology: Dragon 'Build your own' models
 Dragonology: The Complete Book Of Dragons
 Dragonology (Nintendo DS, 2010)

See also

 List of dragons in literature
 List of dragons in games

References

External links
Official website of the Ology series
Templar Publishing Dragonology Page
Candlewick Press Dragonology Page

Book series introduced in 2003
 Fantasy books by series
Young adult novel series
Books illustrated by Helen Ward
Books illustrated by Nghiem Ta
 Works by Dugald Steer
 Books about dragons